This is a demography of the population of Panama including population density, ethnicity, education level, health of the populace, economic status, religious affiliations, and other aspects of the population.

Population
The proportion of the population aged below 15 in 2010 was 29%. 64.5% of the population were aged between 15 and 65, with 6.6% of the population being 65 years or older.

Structure of the population 

Structure of the population (1 July 2013) (Estimates - Data refer to projections based on the 2010 Population Census):

2020 Statistics

Population distribution 
More than half the population lives in the Panama City-Colón metropolitan corridor.

Ethnic groups

The culture, customs, and language of Panama are predominantly Caribbean Spanish. In 2010 the population was 65% Mestizo (mixed European and Amerindian), 12.3% Native Panamanians, 9.2% black, 6.8% mulattoes, and 6.7% white.

European Panamanians
European Panamanians or Caucasian ethnic groups in Panama include Spanish, British and Irish, Dutch, French, Germans, Italians, Portuguese, Poles, Russians or Ukrainians (a large number are Jews), Greeks, and Americans.

Indigenous Panamanians

Asian Panamanians
Panama has a considerable population of Asians origin; in particular Chinese, West Asians (Lebanese, and Palestinians and Syrians) and South Asians (from India and Pakistan). The first Chinese immigrated to Panama from southern China in the 19th century to help build the Panama Railroad. There followed several waves of immigrants, especially after the 1970s, when the ensuing decades saw up to 80,000 immigrants from all over China. At least 50,000 Panamanians are ethnically Chinese, though some estimates count as many as 135,000. Most of the Chinese population reside in the province of Chiriquí. Some studies suggest that almost 1 million Panamanians have at least one Chinese ancestor.

African Panamanians
Afro-Panamanians first arrived during the colonial era. They are intermixed in the general population or live in small Afro-Panamanian communities along the Atlantic Coast and in villages within the Darién jungle. Most of the people in Darien are fishermen or small-scale farmers growing crops such as bananas, rice and coffee as well as raising livestock. Other Afro-Panamanians descend from later migrants from the Caribbean who came to work on railroad-construction projects, commercial agricultural enterprises, and (especially) the canal. Important Afro-Caribbean community areas include towns and cities such as Colón, Cristobal and Balboa, in the former Canal Zone, as well as the Río Abajo area of Panama City. Another region with a large Afro-Caribbean population is the province of Bocas del Toro on the Caribbean coast just south of Costa Rica.

Most of the Panamanian population of West Indian descent owe their presence in the country to the monumental efforts to build the Panama Canal in the late 19th and early 20th centuries. Three-quarters of the 50,000 workers who built the canal were Afro-Caribbean migrants from the British West Indies. Thousands of Afro-Caribbean workers were recruited from Jamaica, Barbados and Trinidad.

Languages
Many languages, including seven indigenous languages, are spoken in Panama, although Spanish is the official and dominant language. The local variant is Panamanian Spanish. English is sometimes spoken by many professionals and those working in the business or governmental sectors of society.

Indigenous languages include Guaymí, Kuna, Northern Embera and Teribe. Bocas del Toro Creole is also spoken.

Religion

The majority of Panamanians are Christian; most are Roman Catholics as a result centuries of Spanish colonial influence. Other faiths exist in Panama by the country's tolerance and freedom of religion, there are large Protestant, Jewish, Bahá'í, Muslim and Hindu religious groups in Panama.

Vital statistics
Registration of vital events is in Panama not complete. The Population Departement of the United Nations prepared the following estimates.

Births and deaths

Census 
Panama's census has been postponed by one year due to the COVID-19 pandemic but the government are currently assessing additional implications. They are evaluating the preparatory processes that can begin now, such as procurement.

See also
Panama
Ethnic groups in Central America

Notes

References